Yannick Fave (born 3 August 1947) is a French rower. He competed in the men's coxless four event at the 1968 Summer Olympics.

References

1947 births
Living people
French male rowers
Olympic rowers of France
Rowers at the 1968 Summer Olympics
Sportspeople from Neuilly-sur-Seine